This is a list of notable events in music that took place in the 1460s.

Events
1464 
22 February – Henry Abyngdon receives a Bachelor of Music at Cambridge, the first recorded musical degree
1465
May – Henry Abyngdon is appointed Master of the Children of the Chapel Royal in London
September – Antoine Busnois is appointed master of the choirboys at Église Saint-Hilaire-le-Grand in Poitiers
1467
Antoine Busnois is employed at the court of Count Charles of Charolais before he becomes Duke of Burgundy
1468
Anna Inglese and her entourage are hired by Duke Galeazzo Maria Sforza of Milan to devise and perform entertainments for his marriage to Bona of Savoy

Compositions
1464
May – Robert Morton writes the first known setting of

Manuscripts
1460
Wolfenbüttel Chansonnier, including compositions by Philippe Basiron

Births
1468
probable
William Cornysh, English composer (d. 1523)

Deaths
1460
20 September – Gilles Binchois, Burgundian composer (b. c.1400)
1466
date unknown
Nicolaus Zacharie, Italian composer (b. c.1400)

References

15th century in music
Music